The 1984 Miami Dolphins season was the team's 19th season, and 15th in the National Football League (NFL). It was also the 15th season with the team for head coach Don Shula. The Dolphins sought to build on a spectacular 1983 season where they went 12–4 with rookie quarterback Dan Marino.

The Dolphins won the 1984 AFC Championship, and appeared in Super Bowl XIX, where they lost to the San Francisco 49ers, 38–16. To date this is the last season the Dolphins appeared in the Super Bowl.

Second year quarterback Dan Marino's passing ability became the focal point of Miami's offense and in 1984 he exploded to set league records with 5,084 passing yards and 48 touchdowns. Marino's touchdown record was broken by Peyton Manning twenty years later and the yardage record was broken by Drew Brees twenty-seven years later. The Dolphins attempted early on to make a run at a perfect season twelve years after pulling off the feat, as they won their first eleven games but were upended in overtime by the San Diego Chargers. The Dolphins scored more than 500 points for the first and to date only time in their history, as they scored 513 points and finished 14–2, their best record since the undefeated season.

The year began on a somber note, as running back David Overstreet was killed in a traffic collision in June. The Dolphins wore helmet decals with the number 20 (his jersey number) in his memory during this season.

NFL Films produced a documentary about the team's season entitled Movers, Shakers and Record Breakers; it was narrated by Brad Crandall.

1984 marked the end of an era, as the last remaining Super Bowl VIII-era Dolphin, longtime offensive lineman Ed Newman, retired after a dozen seasons in the NFL, all with the Dolphins. He holds the unique distinction as being the only man to make it to Super Bowl VIII and Super Bowl XIX as a member of the Dolphins.

Offseason

Draft

Undrafted free agents

Week 1 roster

Regular season

Schedule 

Note: Intra-division opponents are in bold text.

Season summary

Week 1 (Sunday, September 2, 1984): at Washington Redskins 

Point spread: Redskins by 4½
 Over/Under: 46.0 (over)
 Time of Game: 2 hours, 45 minutes

Dan Marino had one of the best passing days of his career, completing 21 of 28 passes for 311 yards with 5 TDs and no interceptions for a Passer Rating of 150.4. This game also marked the emergence of Jim "Crash" Jensen, who lined up as a receiver for the first time and caught 2 of Marino's TD passes. Until 2015, this was the Dolphins' last road win over the Redskins.

Week 2 (Sunday, September 9, 1984): vs. New England Patriots 

Point spread: Dolphins by 6
 Over/Under: 43.0 (under)
 Time of Game: 3 hours, 3 minutes

Dan Marino increased his two-game total of seven touchdown passes as he tossed a pair of scoring strikes to Mark Clayton within a 1:36 span in the third quarter to lead Miami to its 17th straight victory against the Patriots at The Orange Bowl. Miami intercepted four Steve Grogan passes. Mike Kozlowski returned one 26 yards, then laterred to William Judson who rambled the remaining 60 yards for a touchdown.

Week 3 (Monday, September 17, 1984): at Buffalo Bills 

Point spread: 
 Over/Under: 
 Time of Game: 3 hours, 15 minutes

Week 4

Week 5

Week 6

Week 7

Week 8 (Sunday, October 21, 1984): at New England Patriots 

Point spread: Dolphins by 4
 Over/Under: 42.0 (over)
 Time of Game: 3 hours, 13 minutes

Week 9 (Sunday, October 28, 1984): vs. Buffalo Bills 

Point spread: 
 Over/Under: 
 Time of Game: 2 hours, 54 minutes

Week 10

Week 11

Week 12

Week 13

Week 14

Week 15

Week 16

Playoffs

Standings

Player stats

Passing

Postseason

Divisional 

A year after being upended in the playoffs by the Seattle Seahawks the Dolphins routed Seattle 31–10. Dan Marino threw for 264 yards and three touchdowns despite being intercepted twice by Seahawks defensive back John Harris. The Dolphins rushed for 143 yards and a Tony Nathan rushing score as well.

Conference Championship 

    
    
    
    
    
    
    
    
    
    
    

In a shootout, quarterback Dan Marino led the Dolphins to a victory by throwing for 421 yards and four touchdowns with one interception. Steelers quarterback Mark Malone recorded 312 yards and 3 touchdowns, but was intercepted three times.

Super Bowl XIX (Sunday, January 20, 1985): vs. San Francisco 49ers 

Point spread: 49ers by 3
 Over/Under: 53.5 (over)
 Time of Game: 3 hours, 13 minutes

Super Bowl XIX was played on January 20, 1985, and featured the San Francisco 49ers and the Miami Dolphins. The 49ers won their second Super Bowl, defeating the Dolphins 38–16. Dan Marino, the Dolphins quarterback passed for one touchdown and two interceptions, while Joe Montana, the 49ers quarterback passed for 3 touchdowns and rushed for another.

Awards and honors 
 Dan Marino, 1984 NFL MVP
 Dan Marino, 1984 PFWA MVP
 Dan Marino, 1984 NEA MVP
 Dan Marino, 1984 NFL Offensive Player of the Year
 Dan Marino, 1984 UPI AFL-AFC Player of the Year
 Dan Marino, Bert Bell Award

Final roster

Notes

References 

 Miami Dolphins on Pro Football Reference
 Miami Dolphins on jt-sw.com

Miami
Miami Dolphins seasons
AFC East championship seasons
American Football Conference championship seasons
Miami Dolphins